Aylaella is a genus of planthoppers belonging to the family Acanaloniidae.

The species of this genus are found in Madagascar.

Species:
 Aylaella reticulata (Lallemand & Synave, 1954)

References

Acanaloniidae